Iran's annual Tassvir Saal Festival, has been held every February and March in Tehran since 2003.

References

Winter events in Iran